Mike McMahan is an American comedy writer and television producer. He is the creator of the animated comedies Solar Opposites (with Justin Roiland) and Star Trek: Lower Decks.

Career
McMahan, a native of Chicago, first worked in production as an assistant at The Second City. From there, he was hired by Scott Rudin Productions as a production assistant, and worked on Drawn Together and South Park.

McMahan served as a writer and producer on Rick and Morty. He was one of the first writers hired for the series, as he had met co-creator Justin Roiland while working at 20th Century Fox Animation. McMahan described himself as "kind of the sci-fi guy" of the staff, and was promoted to showrunner for the show's fourth season, though he left during production to work on other projects. In 2018, he won the Primetime Emmy Award for Outstanding Animated Program for his work as a supervising producer on the episode "Pickle Rick".

On August 28, 2018, Hulu announced it had ordered an animated comedy Solar Opposites created by McMahan and Roiland. The series premiered on May 8, 2020. In October 2018, McMahan was announced as the creator of Star Trek: Lower Decks for CBS All Access. More recently, he signed an overall deal with CBS Studios.

References

External links

Living people
American television writers
Emmy Award winners
Television producers from Illinois
Writers from Chicago
Year of birth missing (living people)